Paul Dermée (1886–1951) was a Belgian writer, poet, literary critique. Born Camille Janssen in Liège, Belgium in 1886, he died in Paris in 1951.

He knew the painters Picasso, Juan Gris, Sonia and Robert Delaunay and the poets Valéry Larbaud and Max Jacob.

His wife, Céline Arnauld, was also an active poet and participant in the Paris Dada movement.

Discovered by the writer Tristan Tzara, he took the risk (in times of war) to diffuse the "Dada" review in the province of Zurich. In exchange he received the title "Proconsul Dada".

He was director of the magazine L'Esprit Nouveau.

20th-century Belgian poets
Belgian male poets
Writers from Liège
1886 births
1951 deaths
20th-century Belgian male writers